James P. Postles (September 28, 1840 – May 27, 1908) was an American soldier who fought with the Union Army in the American Civil War. Postles received his country's highest award for bravery during combat, the Medal of Honor, for actions taken on July 2, 1863 during the Battle of Gettysburg.

Civil War service
Postles joined Company C of the 1st Delaware Regiment in Wilmington, Delaware. After a three-month enlistment, Postles was mustered out as a 1st Sergeant. When the regiment reorganized, Postles was placed in Company A as a 1st Lieutenant.

Postles' first major conflict was at the Battle of Antietam. During an attack in the Sunken Road, Company A lost roughly half its men, including its captain. Following the battle, Postles was lauded by his commanding officer as behaving with "exemplary coolness and bravery", and was named the new Captain for Company A. Postles also received commendations during the Battle of Gettysburg when he volunteered to ride on horseback to deliver a letter in the face of heavy enemy fire, and returned unharmed. For this action, Postles was awarded the Medal of Honor.

Medal of Honor citation

Personal life
Following the war, Postles returned to Delaware where we entered into his father's leather business. In 1878, he served as Adjutant General of Delaware.  He was a companion of the Pennsylvania Commandery of the Military Order of the Loyal Legion of the United States.

Postles died of a brain concussion after falling down a set of stairs at the Wilmington Masonic Temple.  He was interred at the Wilmington and Brandywine Cemetery.

References

External links
James P. Postles on Find A Grave

1840 births
1908 deaths
American Civil War recipients of the Medal of Honor
People from Kent County, Delaware
People of Delaware in the American Civil War
United States Army Medal of Honor recipients
Burials at Wilmington and Brandywine Cemetery